Kiri is a town in Mai-Ndombe Province, Democratic Republic of the Congo. It is the headquarters of Kiri Territory.
As of 2012 the estimated population was 14,612.

References

Populated places in Mai-Ndombe Province